Mo' Roots is the seventh studio album by American blues artist Taj Mahal. The musician turned away from his normal fare to record a reggae inspired collection.

Track listing
All tracks composed by Taj Mahal; except where indicated
 "Johnny Too Bad" (Delroy Wilson, Winston Bailey, Hylton Beckford, Derrick Crooks)
 "Black Jack Davey"
 "Big Mama"
 "Cajun Waltz"
 "Slave Driver" (Bob Marley)
 "Why Did You Have to Desert Me?"
 "Desperate Lover" (Bob Andy)
 "Clara (St. Kitts Woman)"

Personnel
Taj Mahal - vocals
Hoshal Wright - guitar
Bill Rich - bass
Merl Saunders - organ
Aston "Family Man" Barrett - ska piano
Kwasi "Rocki" Dzidzornu - percussion, congas
Kester Smith - trap drums
Rudy Costa - soprano saxophone, flute
Sister Carole Fredericks, Sister Claudia Lennear, Brother Tommy Henderson - backing vocals

References

1974 albums
Taj Mahal (musician) albums
Columbia Records albums